Patrick Hogan (25 March 1907 – 5 October 1972) was an Irish Fine Gael politician and surgeon. He was elected to Dáil Éireann as a Fine Gael Teachta Dála (TD) for the Tipperary South constituency at the 1961 general election. He was re-elected at the 1965 and 1969 general elections. He died before the 1973 general election but no by-election was called to replace him. Party colleague Brendan Griffin won a seat in the 1973 general election.

References

1907 births
1972 deaths
Fine Gael TDs
Members of the 17th Dáil
Members of the 18th Dáil
Members of the 19th Dáil
Politicians from County Tipperary